Black Arm Band is an Aboriginal Australian and Torres Strait Islander  music theatre organisation.

History
The organisation was founded in late 2005 by Steven Richardson and has produced seven large-scale productions since its debut performance at the Melbourne Festival of the Arts in 2006 in addition to ongoing educational and development work in remote Aboriginal communities. The organisation's name comes from a speech by former Australian prime minister John Howard, who referred to a "black armband view of history".

Their first show, murundak (meaning "alive" in Woiwurrung), debuted at the 2006 Melbourne International Arts Festival and afterwards played around Australia and internationally in London. Their second show, Hidden Republic, debuted at the 2008 Melbourne International Arts Festival. Both the 2006 and 2008 festivals were under the artistic direction of Kristy Edmunds.

In 2009 the new artistic director of the renamed Melbourne Festival, Brett Sheehy, continued the relationship with Black Arm Band. This saw the commissioning and presentation of the world premiere of Dirtsong, a piece of musical theatre conceived and directed by Steven Richardson, in 2009. With words written by Miles Franklin Award-winner Alexis Wright, Dirtsong, included both contemporary and traditional songs, and was a celebration of preservation of Indigenous languages. The show was reprised for the 2014 Adelaide Festival, with performers including Trevor Jamieson (who was not in the 2009 version), Archie Roach, Lou Bennett, Emma Donovan, Paul Dempsey, and many other singers and musicians. Some of the songs were sung in Aboriginal languages.

Seven Songs to Leave Behind (2010) was also conceived and directed by Richardson. Seven Songs was an international collaboration by contemporary Indigenous singers and musicians, including Gurrumul Yunupingu, joined by Sinéad O'Connor, John Cale, Rickie Lee Jones and Meshell Ndegeocello.

Notes From the Hard Road And Beyond (2011, also by Richardson) saw Mavis Staples, Joss Stone, Emmanuel Jal and Paul Dempsey join Black Arm Band to celebrate protest music from the 1960s through to contemporary Indigenous songs of activism.

Members
Members are drawn from around Australia and include both blackfella and white musicians with diverse musical backgrounds.

 David Arden
 Mark Atkins
 Lou Bennett
 Deline Briscoe
 George Burarrwanga
 John Butler
 Liz Cavanagh
 Sally Dastey
 Emma Donovan
 Kutcha Edwards
 Dewayne Everettsmith
 Leah Flanagan
 Carole Fraser
 Joe Geia
 Shane Howard
 Ruby Hunter
 Paul Kelly
 Bunna Lawrie
 Jimmy Little
 Rachael Maza
 Djolpa McKenzie
 Lee Morgan
 Shellie Morris
 Stephen Pigram
 Archie Roach
 Peter Rotumah
 Amy Saunders
 Greg Sheehan
 Dan Sultan
 Bart Willoughby
 Ursula Yovich
 Gurrumul Yunupingu
 Gabanbulu Yunupingu

Productions
murundak, 2006
Hidden Republic, 2008
Dirtsong, 2009
Seven Songs to Leave Behind, 2010
Notes from the Hard Road and Beyond, 2011
Mamiaith - Mother Tongue, 2012
Ngangwarra means heart, 2013
Nyami, a collaboration with the Bangarra Dance Theatre, in production 2018

Discography

Albums

Awards
In 2013, the group won the Building Health through the Arts Award.

The Deadly Awards
The Deadly Awards, commonly known simply as The Deadlys, was an annual celebration of Australian Aboriginal and Torres Strait Islander achievement in music, sport, entertainment and community. The ran from 1995 to 2013.

! 
|-
| Deadly Awards 2008
| Black Arm Band
| Band of the Year
| 
| 
|-

Helpmann Awards
The Helpmann Awards is an awards show, celebrating live entertainment and performing arts in Australia, presented by industry group Live Performance Australia since 2001. Note: 2020 and 2021 were cancelled due to the COVID-19 pandemic.
 

! 
|-
| 2010
| Dirtsong (with Steven Richardson and Alexis Wright)
| Helpmann Award for Best New Australian Work
| 
| 
|-

Sidney Myer Performing Arts Awards
The Sidney Myer Performing Arts Awards commenced in 1984 and recognise outstanding achievements in dance, drama, comedy, music, opera, circus and puppetry.

! 
|-
| 2010 || Black Arm Band || Group  Award ||  || 
|-

References

External links
Official site

Indigenous Australian musical groups
Indigenous Australian theatre